Louise  Arbour  (born February 10, 1947) is a Canadian lawyer, prosecutor and jurist.

Arbour was the UN High Commissioner for Human Rights, a former justice of the Supreme Court of Canada and the Court of Appeal for Ontario and a former Chief Prosecutor of the International Criminal Tribunals for the former Yugoslavia and Rwanda. From 2009 until 2014, she served as President and CEO of the International Crisis Group. She made history with the indictment of a sitting head of state, Yugoslavian president Slobodan Milošević, as well as the first prosecution of sexual assault as a crime against humanity. From March 2017 to December 2018 she was the Special Representative of the United Nations Secretary-General for International Migration.  She is currently in private practice in Montreal.

Early life and education
Louise Arbour was born in Montreal, Quebec to Bernard and Rose (née Ravary) Arbour, the owners of a hotel chain. She attended convent school, during which time her parents divorced. As editor of the school magazine, she earned a reputation for irreverence.

In 1967, she graduated from Collège Regina Assumpta, and proceeded to the Université de Montréal where she completed an LL.B. with distinction in 1970. She became the law clerk for Justice Louis-Philippe Pigeon of the Supreme Court of Canada in 1971–72 while completing graduate studies at the Faculty of Law (Civil Section) of the University of Ottawa. This is where she met her long time common-law partner Larry Taman, with whom she lived for 27 years. In a 2014 interview, Arbour named the move from Quebec to Ontario as the "biggest hurdle [she] had to overcome to succeed in [her] career," as her entire education had been in French.

She was called to the Bar of Quebec in 1971 and to the Law Society of Upper Canada in 1977.

Personal life
She has three adult children: Emilie, Patrick and Catherine. Her daughter Emilie Taman was a NDP candidate in the 2015 Canadian election in the electoral district of Ottawa—Vanier. Emilie also was a candidate for the NDP in the 2017 by-election and 2019 general election. She also has three grandchildren. Louise's son-in-law (common law spouse to Emilie Taman) is noted Ottawa criminal lawyer Michael Spratt, who was named one of Canadas top 25 most influential lawyers in 2020 and is a partner at the Ottawa criminal law firm AGP LLP.

Louise is a member of the Global Commission on Drug Policy and of the International Commission Against the Death Penalty.

Legal career

Canada
From 1972–73, Arbour was research officer for the Law Reform Commission of Canada. She then taught at Osgoode Hall Law School, York University, first as a Lecturer (1974), then as Assistant Professor (1975), Associate Professor (1977-87), and finally as Associate Professor and Associate Dean (1987). She was Vice-President of the Canadian Civil Liberties Association until her appointment to the Supreme Court of Ontario (High Court of Justice) in 1987 and to the Court of Appeal for Ontario in 1990. In 1995, Arbour was appointed as President of a Commission of Inquiry, under the Inquiries Act, for the purpose of investigating and reporting on events at the Prison for Women in Kingston, Ontario, following allegations by prisoners of abuse. The inquiry resulted in the publication of the Arbour Report.

The Hague
In 1996, at Richard Goldstone's recommendation, Arbour was appointed as his replacement as Chief Prosecutor of the International Criminal Tribunal for Rwanda in Arusha, and of the International Criminal Tribunal for the former Yugoslavia (ICTY) in The Hague. She indicted then-Serbian President Slobodan Milošević for war crimes, the first time a serving head of State was called to account before an international court.

Supreme Court of Canada
In 1999, Prime Minister Jean Chrétien appointed Arbour to the Supreme Court of Canada on May 26, just one day before the publication of the indictment of Milosevic by the International Criminal Tribunal for the former Yugoslavia (ICTY).

In 2004, Arbour retired from the Supreme Court of Canada, having served for just under five years.

Career after law

United Nations High Commissioner of Human Rights 
After leaving the Supreme Court of Canada, Arbour became the United Nations High Commissioner of Human Rights. She criticized a number of countries for their human rights records. In 2008, she stepped down after serving one four year term.

Works and awards
She has been published in the area of criminal procedure and criminal law, in both French and English. At various times, she has served as an editor for the Criminal Reports, the Canadian Rights Reporter, and the Osgoode Hall Law Journal.

In 2005, Arbour was awarded the Thomas J. Dodd Prize in International Justice and Human Rights, along with Justice Richard Goldstone, in recognition of her work on the International Criminal Tribunals for the former Yugoslavia and Rwanda. She was the subject of a 2005 fact-based Canadian-German made-for-television movie, which follows her quest to indict Bosnian Serb war criminals. Arbour was played by Canadian actress Wendy Crewson.

She was made a Companion to the Order of Canada in 2007 "for her contributions to the Canadian justice system and for her dedication to the advancement of human rights throughout the world". She was made a Grand Officer of the National Order of Quebec in 2009.

She was made a Commander of the National Order of the Legion of Honour in 2011. She has been awarded numerous honorary degrees, including Doctor of Civil Laws from the University of Western Ontario in June 2000, Doctor of Humane Letters from Mount Saint Vincent University in May 2001, and Doctor of Laws degrees from the University of British Columbia in November 2001, the University of Waterloo in October 2006, in June 2009 from the University of Alberta and University of Guelph, and from Simon Fraser University in October 2009.

On March 9, 2017, Arbour was appointed by the U.N. Secretary-General, António Guterres, to be his Special Representative for International Migration.

In April 2021, Arbour was appointed to lead an independent review of the military’s handling of sexual assault, harassment and other misconduct, by Canadian Minister of National Defence Harjit Sajjan. In May 2022, she delivered her report to Canadian Minister of National Defence Anita Anand.

She is currently a member of the Whitney R. Harris World Law Institute's International Council.

In January 2023, Arbour was awarded the 2023 Sandra Day O’Connor Justice Prize from Arizona State University, a lifetime achievement award for human rights work as well as upholding the rule of law and judicial independence.

See also
 Reasons of the Supreme Court of Canada by Justice Arbour
 The Canadian made-for-TV movie  (2005) is a docudrama account of Arbour's work as prosecutor for the International Criminal Tribunal for the Former Yugoslavia.

Footnotes

External links

United Nations High Commissioner for Human Rights Profile of Louise Arbour
 
 Concordia University Honorary Degree Citation , June 2001, Concordia University Records Management and Archives

1947 births
Living people
Canadian women judges
Clerks of the Supreme Court of Canada
Commandeurs of the Légion d'honneur
Companions of the Order of Canada
French Quebecers
Grand Officers of the National Order of Quebec
Grand Officers of the Order of the Crown (Belgium)
International Criminal Tribunal for Rwanda prosecutors
International Criminal Tribunal for the former Yugoslavia prosecutors
Justices of the Supreme Court of Canada
Justices of the Court of Appeal for Ontario
Special Representatives of the Secretary-General of the United Nations
Lawyers in Ontario
Lawyers from Montreal
Canadian women diplomats
Université de Montréal alumni
University of Ottawa alumni
Academic staff of the Osgoode Hall Law School
United Nations High Commissioners for Human Rights
Under-Secretaries-General of the United Nations
Constitutional court women judges
Canadian women lawyers
Université de Montréal Faculty of Law alumni
University of Ottawa Faculty of Law alumni
Canadian officials of the United Nations
Recipients of the Four Freedoms Award
Women legal scholars